MCAA may refer to:

Science
 Monochloroacetic acid

Organizations  

Marine Corps Aviation Association, organization dedicated to the advancement of United States Marine Corps aviation
Mason Contractors Association of America